Clausocalanidae is a family of copepods belonging to the order Calanoida.

Genera:
 Clausocalanus Giesbrecht, 1888
 Ctenocalanus Giesbrecht, 1888
 Drepanopus Brady, 1883
 Microcalanus Sars, 1903
 Peniculoides Markhaseva & Renz, 2015
 Pseudocalanus Boeck, 1872
 Spicipes Grice & Hulsemann, 1965
 Streptocalanus

References

Copepods